Calycina horaki is a species of beetle in the genus Calycina. It was described Ruzzier and Kovalev in 2016.

References

Mordellidae
Beetles described in 2016